Thaddeus Joseph Butler (November 1, 1833 – July 27, 1897) was an American Roman Catholic priest and bishop-elect.

Butler was born in Limerick, Ireland. He studied at All Hallows College in Dublin, Ireland and at the Propaganda College in Rome, Italy. He immigrated to the United States and was ordained to the priesthood for the Roman Catholic Archdiocese of Chicago. He was pastor of St. Mary's Parish in Chicago and taught at St. Mary's Seminary. During the American Civil War, he served as chaplain for the Union Army. On July 5, 1897, Butler was appointed bishop of the Diocese of Concordia (now the Diocese of Salina). However, he died, in Rome, before he was ordained bishop.

Notes

External links
Catholic Hierarchy.org.-Father Thaddeus Joseph Butler 

1833 births
1897 deaths
Irish emigrants to the United States (before 1923)
Clergy from Limerick (city)
Clergy from Chicago
People of Illinois in the American Civil War
Alumni of All Hallows College, Dublin
Roman Catholic Archdiocese of Chicago
Roman Catholic Diocese of Salina
Catholics from Illinois
19th-century American Roman Catholic priests